Aegires incusus is a species of sea slug. It is a dorid nudibranch, a shell-less marine gastropod mollusc in the family Aegiridae.

Distribution 
This species was described from Mora Mora, Tulear, Madagascar. It has also been reported from the Philippine Islands and Japan.

References

Aegiridae
Gastropods described in 2004